Trypillia is a selo in Obukhiv Raion (district) of Kyiv Oblast in central Ukraine, with 2,800 inhabitants (as of 1 January 2005). It belongs to Ukrainka urban hromada, one of the hromadas of Ukraine.

Trypillia is the site of an ancient mega-settlement dating to 4300–4000 BCE belonging to the Cucuteni-Trypillian culture. Settlements of this culture were as large as 200 hectares. This proto-city is just one of 2440 Cucuteni-Trypillia settlements discovered so far in Moldova and Ukraine. 194 (8%) of these settlements had an area of more than 10 hectares between 5000–2700 BCE and more than 29 settlements had an area in the range 100–450 hectares.

History 

It was near Trypillia that archaeologist Vikentiy Khvoyka discovered an extensive Neolithic site of the Cucuteni-Trypillian culture, one of the major Neolithic-Chalcolithic cultures of eastern Europe. Khvoika reported his findings in 1897 to the 11th Congress of Archaeologists, marking the official date of the discovery of this culture.

The name Trypillia means 'three fields' in the Slavic languages. It was first mentioned by Kyivan chroniclers in connection with the Battle of the Stugna River in 1093. During the 12th century, Trypillia was a fortress that defended approaches towards Kyiv from the steppe. One of its rulers was Mstislav Mstislavich. During the subsequent centuries, the town dwindled into insignificance. In 1919 it was the venue of the Trypillia Incident, in which Ukrainian forces under Danylo Terpylo massacred a unit of Bolsheviks.

See also
History of Ukraine
Neolithic Europe

Notes

Bibliography
Videiko M. Yu. Trypillia Civilization in Prehistory of Europe. Kyiv Domain Archeological Museum, Kyiv, 2005.

External links

Trypillian Museum
Ukrainian Neolith
The Trypillia-USA-Project The Trypillian Civilization Society homepage (in English).
Trypillian Culture from Ukraine A page from the UK-based group "Arattagar" about Trypillian Culture, which has many great photographs of the group's trip to the Trypillian Museum in Trypillia, Ukraine (in English).

Villages in Obukhiv Raion
Archaeological sites in Ukraine
Archaeology of Ukraine
Archaeological type sites